Luca Sestak (born January 10, 1995 in Celle, Lower Saxony, Germany) is a German boogie-woogie, blues and jazz pianist and composer.

Musical career 
Sestak began playing piano, at the age of eight and a half, when he was sent by his parents to a piano teacher. In 2012 he told Birgitta Larsson of "Jefferson Blues Magazine":

"My father tried to teach me a little piano playing when I was 8, but I hated it. When I was nine and a half he sent me to a piano teacher. I didn’t like classical music at all. At eleven and a half, after two years of lessons, I was supposed to play a Beethoven sonata. It was after this point that playing the piano began to really give me pleasure.  Today, however, my relating to classical music is diminishing again; to be honest, it isn’t easy to run on two tracks and my heart beats much louder for the blues."

After two years of classical piano lessons Sestak discovered jazz and blues music, in particular boogie-woogie, on the internet mainly through YouTube. Immediately captivated by this musical style, he began to teach himself blues piano while still taking classical lessons. In December 2006, he shared his first videos on YouTube which brought him public fame. In 2007, at the age of 12, Sestak visited the International Boogie Woogie Festival at Lugano, Switzerland, where he knew Axel Zwingenberger would perform.

By March 2014 his earliest videos had received as many as 1.8 million hits. After appearances in his home town of Karlsruhe, Sestak's fame continued to grow through videos. As he grew older, he began performing regularly in concerts and festivals in Germany, Austria, Switzerland, France, Sweden, Italy, Belgium, the Netherlands, USA and other countries, alongside Vince Weber, Ben Waters, Silvan Zingg, Pete York, Bob Seeley and Frank Muschalle. 

In 2010, Sestak appeared on German TV for the first time in “Kaffee oder Tee” on SWR.

Discography
 2010: Lost in Boogie (solo CD)
 2014: New Way (solo CD)
 2020: Right or Wrong

Awards

 2008: "Jugend musiziert" contest in Karlsruhe. 1st prize with promotion to "State Contest"
 2008: "Jugend musiziert" State Contest Baden-Württemberg, 3rd prize
 2011: German Pinetop Award 2011 “Discovery of the Year"
 2012: "SummerJazz" Prize of SummerJazz festival in Pinneberg, Germany
 2012: Yamaha Junior Generation Prize/Promotion Prize

References

External links

 Luca Sestak's website

Boogie-woogie pianists
Blues pianists
German jazz pianists
Living people
1995 births
21st-century pianists
Jazz-pop pianists
Okeh Records artists